Women in Music Pt. III is the third studio album by American rock band Haim. It was released on June 26, 2020, in the United States by Columbia Records and internationally by Polydor Records. The album was originally set for release on April 24, 2020 but was delayed due to the effects of the COVID-19 pandemic and "the changing nature of travel policies and quarantines across the world." The release was later moved to June 26. It was produced by Danielle Haim, Rostam Batmanglij and Ariel Rechtshaid, and was preceded by the singles "Summer Girl", "Now I'm in It" and "Hallelujah". The song "The Steps" was released alongside the album pre-order.

Before its official announcement, Women in Music Pt. III was named one of the most anticipated albums of 2020 by several outlets, including Pitchfork and Vulture. The album received widespread critical acclaim, with critics praising its honest and vulnerable lyrics and its experimentation with a wide range of genres, while also paying homage to several other artists. It was eventually nominated for Album of the Year at the 63rd Grammy Awards, while "The Steps" was nominated for Best Rock Performance.

Background and composition
The trio initially teased the album with the abbreviation WIMPIII on their social media, jokingly offering a "free T-shirt" to anybody who could guess what it stood for or who had an answer that made them laugh.

After touring in support of their previous album, Something to Tell You (2017), the band experienced various personal struggles, including unprocessed grief from the death of Alana's best friend in a car accident in 2012, Este's struggles with type 1 diabetes, and Danielle's depression as well as her partner Ariel Rechtshaid's cancer diagnosis. They channeled these experiences into their music, with "an unflinching honesty" and "intimately familiar with depression in all its states". True to the album's title, many songs discuss the misogyny the band faces in the music industry; for example "Man from the Magazine" is a tongue-in-cheek Joni Mitchell-esque song about the casually sexist questions asked of them by journalists.

The album cover was shot at Canter's Deli in Los Angeles by Paul Thomas Anderson, who also directed the music videos for all three singles and "The Steps", as well as for later directing the 2021 film Licorice Pizza which starred Alana.

Women in Music Pt. III is a primarily soft rock album that features elements of folk-pop, hip hop, reggae, lo-fi, heartland rock, dance, country rock, UK garage, electropop, free jazz, funk, 1990s R&B, as well as 1970s and 1980s pop. Danielle Haim cited Outkast's Speakerboxxx/The Love Below (2003) as a key source of influence for the band that inspired the eclectic nature of their album. She explained, "We thought it would be cool to make a body of work that didn't adhere to specific rules or genre, like they did."

Release
The album's first single, "Summer Girl", preceded the album by several months, becoming the first of three (at the time) standalone singles released that same year, along with "Now I'm in It" and "Hallelujah", with a music video for each release, all directed by frequent collaborator Paul Thomas Anderson.

Critical reception

Women in Music Pt. III was met with universal acclaim from critics. At Metacritic, which assigns a weighted average rating out of 100 to reviews from mainstream publications, this release received an average score of 89, based on 23 reviews. The album was a New York Times Critic's Pick and was featured on Pitchforks Best New Music.

Many critics noted the trio's use of new sounds and exploration of new genres on the album. Writing for Pitchfork, Aimee Cliff called it "Haim as we haven’t quite heard them before: not just eminently proficient musicians, entertainers, and 'women in music,' but full of flaws and contradictions, becoming something much greater." Cliff wrote that the album "eschew[s] Haim's usual summery rock to find the right genre for the mood" sometimes mixing multiple genres within the same track. Lindsay Zoladz, writing for The New York Times, remarked that the record "clears a welcome path forward for the group's sound," cautioning that  "every so often they overstuff the arrangements with one too many sonic quirks or spoken-word bridges, but more often than not their risks are rewarding." Reviewing in his Substack-published "Consumer Guide" column, Robert Christgau applauded Batmanglij for enhancing the band's compositions, in which, "from booty calls to dreams so much sweeter than what anyone wakes up to in this cruel time, the lyrics evoke the pains and complexities of the single life each of these seamless siblings is obliged to face alone after all."

In July 2020, the album was included on Entertainment Weekly and Slant Magazines list of the best albums of 2020 so far.

Accolades
On November 24, 2020, the album was nominated for Album of the Year at the 63rd Annual Grammy Awards, marking the band's first nomination in that category. The single "The Steps" was also nominated for Best Rock Performance, marking the group's first nomination in that category as well.

Commercial performance
Women in Music Pt. III entered at number one on the UK Albums Chart, selling 17,762 copies in its opening week. The album became the band's second number one album in the UK after their debut album Days Are Gone in 2013. In Ireland, the album entered and peaked at number five in the album charts, becoming their 3rd top five album in the country.

In Australia, the album entered at number seven on the album charts, becoming their third Top 10 album. In the United States, Women in Music Pt. III debuted and peaked at number thirteen on the US Billboard 200, making the album the group's third Top 20 record.

Track listing
All tracks are produced by Danielle Haim, Rostam Batmanglij and Ariel Rechtshaid, except where noted.

Notes
"Summer Girl" contains a portion of the composition "Walk on the Wild Side", written by Lou Reed.

Personnel
All track numbers refer to the digital, CD and cassette releases of the album.

Haim
 Danielle Haim – vocals (all tracks), electric guitar (1, 3–6, 10, 12, 14, 15), drums (1–5, 7–10, 12, 16), guitar (2, 7), drum programming (3, 6, 12), congas (8, 10, 14), acoustic guitar (9, 11, 14), synthesizer (12), lead guitar (13), bass programming (16)
 Este Haim – bass (1, 2, 4–12, 14), vocals (1–10, 12–16), upright bass (16)
 Alana Haim – organ (1), piano (1), bass (1), vocals (1–10, 12–16), acoustic guitar (2, 9, 11), shaker (2), electric guitar (4–6, 8, 10, 12), guitar (7, 16), lead guitar (13), congas (14)

Additional musicians
 Rostam Batmanglij – electric guitar (1, 2, 4, 5, 7, 8, 10, 12, 14), organ (1, 7, 10, 16), piano (1, 4, 10, 14), horn arrangement (1, 8, 10), 12-string guitar (2, 9), synthesizer (3, 4, 8, 13, 14, 16), side-chained bass (3), acoustic guitar (4–7, 9–11, 16), vocals (4, 6, 7, 9, 10), bass (5), Mellotron (5), accordion (5), CS-80 (5), drum programming (7, 8, 12–14, 16), mandolin (7), double bass (9), Orchestron (9), rhythm guitar (13), synth programming (14), string arrangement (15), shaker (16), slide guitar (16), saxophone arrangement (16)
 Cass McCombs – electric guitar (2, 4)
 Ariel Rechtshaid – synthesizer (2–4, 6, 7, 12, 14), bass (2, 4, 11), organ (2, 4), drum programming (3–6, 12–14), electric guitar (3, 12), acoustic guitar (3), vocals (3, 4, 6, 14), flange guitar (5), turntables (6), harmonium (9), hand drums (9), horn arrangement (10), synth programming (14), electric guitar drones (15), tambourine (16), additional drums (16), CDJ (16)
 Buddy Ross – organ (2), synth and drum programming (3), synthesizer (8, 14)
 Benji Lysaght – acoustic guitar (2), electric guitar (6)
 Philip Peterson – cello (3)
 Joe Thornally – spoken word (6)
 Tommy King – Chamberlin (6), harpsichord (6), synthesizer (6), piano (8), Juno (8), Mellotron (8), Yamaha PS-30 (8), Moog (8)
 JJ Kirkpatrick – trumpet (8)
 Julian Maclanahan – mandolin (9), violin (15)
 Henry Solomon – saxophone (1, 10, 16)
 Amir Yagmai – electric guitar (12)
 Jim-E Stack – drum programming (13)
 Jack Hallenbeck – synthesizer (13)
 Rob Moose – violin (15), viola (15), string arrangement (15)
 Tobias Jesso Jr. – acoustic guitar (15)

Engineers
 Ariel Rechtshaid – engineering (all tracks), mixing (6, 8, 10–13, 16)
 Rostam Batmanglij – engineering (all tracks), mixing (6, 8, 10–13, 16)
 John DeBold – engineering (all tracks)
 Joey Messina Doerning – engineering (1–13)
 Tristan Friebderg Rodman – engineering (1, 9, 15)
 Matt DiMona – engineering (1–10, 12), assistance (14–16)
 Jasmine Chen – engineering (1–7, 10), assistance (14–16)
 Chris Kasych – engineering (2, 6, 8, 16)
 Dave Schiffman – engineering (4, 5)
 Dalton Ricks – engineering (4, 14, 16)
 Michael Harris – engineering (15, 16)
 Grace Banks – engineering (15, 16)
 Nate Head – engineering (16)
 Dave Fridmann – mixing (1, 4, 9)
 Tom Elmhirst – mixing (2, 3, 5, 7, 15)
 Manny Marroquin – mixing (14)
 Shawn Everett – mixing (12,16)
 Chris Galland – mix engineering (14)
 Robin Florent – mix assistance (14)
 Scott Desmarais – mix assistance (14)
 Jeremie Inhaber – mix assistance (14)
 Matt Scatchell – mix assistance (2, 3, 5, 7, 15)
 Emily Lazar – mastering
 Chris Allgood – mastering assistance

Artwork
 Paul Thomas Anderson – photography, art direction
 Erica Frauman – photography, art direction
 Florencia Martin – photography, art direction
 Sergie Loobkoff – photography, art direction
 Maria Paula Marulanda – design
 Marek Polewski – design

Charts

Weekly charts

Year-end charts

Certifications

Notes

References

External links
 

2020 albums
Albums produced by Ariel Rechtshaid
Albums produced by Rostam Batmanglij
Columbia Records albums
Haim (band) albums
Albums postponed due to the COVID-19 pandemic
Albums recorded at Electro-Vox Recording Studios